

Men's 200 m Freestyle - Final

Men's 200 m Freestyle - Heats

Men's 200 m Freestyle - Heat 01

Men's 200 m Freestyle - Heat 02

Men's 200 m Freestyle - Heat 03

Men's 200 m Freestyle - Heat 04

Men's 200 m Freestyle - Heat 05

Swimming at the 2006 Commonwealth Games